Cape Hooker may refer to:

 Cape Hooker (South Shetland Islands)
 Cape Hooker (Antarctica)